Modrý album (Blue Album) is the twelfth studio album by Slovak singer Miroslav Žbirka, released on Universal Music in 2001.

Track listing

Official releases
 2001: Modrý album, CD, Universal Music, No. 013 754
 2001: Modrý album, CD, bonus tracks, Universal Music, No. 013 754
 2010: Zlatá edice: Modrý album, CD, Universal Music, #013 754

Credits and personnel

 Miroslav Žbirka – lead vocal, writer, acoustic guitar, co-producer
 Marika Gombitová – lead vocal
 Martha – lead vocal
 Aleš Zenkl – producer

 Honza Horáček – producer
 Andrej Lažo – engineer, mastered-by
 Milan Cimfe – engineer, mastered-by

Charts

Weekly charts

Year-end charts

References

General

Specific

External links 
 

2001 albums
Miroslav Žbirka albums